Ivan Chopin (1798 - 15 August 1870) was a historian, ethnographer and statesman of French origin.

History 
Ivan Chopin was born in 1798 in France and lived there till 1820s. The circumstances of his birth and upbringing are unknown. In the mid-1820s, he came to Russia, where he took the name of Ivan Ivanovich, and remained for a long time in the Caucasian civil service. In 1829 he was instructed by the Governor of the Caucasus Paskevich to make the description of the newly conquered territories of Eastern Armenia. From 1829 till 1832 Chopin was engaged in a detailed study of the Erivan and Nakhichevan khanate, which by Treaty of Turkmenchay in 1828 were given to the Russian Empire and were named as the Armenian Oblast.

Collecting material for future books, Ivan met with people of different ethnical origin, observed their customs and culture. In 1830 Chopin was appointed as advisor of the Armenian regional government, in 1833 he was chairman of the Department of Revenue and the state-owned property of the Armenian Oblast, and after - an official for special assignments Chief Commander of the Transcaucasian region.

Literature 
 Алибекова Э. Б. — Вопросы древней истории Азербайджана в российской историографии XIX — начала XX вв. Баку, 2009. 

Demidov Prize laureates
Historians from the Russian Empire
Male writers from the Russian Empire
1798 births
1870 deaths
People from the Russian Empire of French descent